The 1994 Houston Cougars football team, also known as the Houston Cougars, Houston, or UH represented the University of Houston in the 1994 NCAA Division I-A football season.  It was the 49th year of season play for Houston. The team was coached by Kim Helton.  The team split its home games between the Houston Astrodome and Robertson Stadium.

Schedule
The Cougars played a home game in their on-campus Robertson Stadium for the first time since 1950.

References

Houston
Houston Cougars football seasons
Houston Cougars football